San Antonio de Padua Church is a historic church along State Road 63 in Pecos, New Mexico.  It was built during 1903 to 1906 and added to the National Register of Historic Places in 1978.

See also
San Antonio de Padua del Quemado Chapel in Cordova, New Mexico, also NRHP-listed in 1978

National Register of Historic Places listings in San Miguel County, New Mexico
Properties of religious function on the National Register of Historic Places in New Mexico

References

External links

Churches in San Miguel County, New Mexico
Roman Catholic churches in New Mexico
Roman Catholic churches completed in 1906
Churches on the National Register of Historic Places in New Mexico
National Register of Historic Places in San Miguel County, New Mexico
1906 establishments in New Mexico Territory
20th-century Roman Catholic church buildings in the United States